Libellula needhami, or Needham's skimmer, is a species of skimmer in the family of dragonflies known as Libellulidae. It is found in the Bahamas, Cuba, Mexico, and the United States.

The IUCN conservation status of Libellula needhami is "LC", least concern, with no immediate threat to the species' existence. The population is stable.

The species is named after the American entomologist James George Needham.

Description
Males have a red face, females have a brown or yellow face.

This species can be separated from the very similar Libellula auripennis by the following:
 their posterior (rear) wing veins do not become orange
 their costa changes color on opposite sides of the node: outer half is lighter, inner half is darker
 their hind tibia are brown, not black

References

Further reading

External links

 

Libellulidae
Articles created by Qbugbot
Insects described in 1943